Taxidevontas stin Ellada  (Greek: Ταξιδεύοντας στην Ελλάδα; English: Travelling in Greece) is a Greek television travelling documentary series airing on ERT. Magia Tsokli's journeys were initially concentrated on Greece, but they later included places linked with Greek history and culture, outside of the Greek borders, such as Alexandria, Imvros and Cappadocia. The series premiered in the season 1999–2000 and continued for 5 consecutive seasons until 2003–04. From 2004 the series continued with the title Travelling with Magia Tsokli to destinations all around the globe.

Episodes

References

External links

Greek-language television shows
1999 Greek television series debuts
2000s Greek television series